Kim Yoon-ah (born March 11, 1974) is a South Korean singer and songwriter. She is known as the lead singer in the modern rock group Jaurim. She also released several solo albums. She also made her musical theatre debut in 2015, playing the role of Mrs. Danvers from 2015 Korean production of Rebecca the musical, though after the premiere performance she left the production due to severe laryngitis.

Personal life 
In 2006, she married dentist & television presenter Kim Hyung-gyu. They have one child.

Discography

Albums
 Shadow of Your Smile / 2001
 Glass Mask / 2004
 315360 / 2010
 The Pain of Others / 2016

Soundtracks

Digital Singles
 KYRIE / 2016
 Goodbye / 2016
 Glass / 2016

Filmography

Film

Television drama

Radio shows

References

External links 
 

1974 births
21st-century South Korean singers
21st-century South Korean women singers
Living people
Musicians from Seoul
South Korean film actresses
South Korean pop rock singers
South Korean singer-songwriters
South Korean women singer-songwriters
Anti–Iraq War activists